Mario Antonio Iriarte Donoso (born August 8, 1955) is a Chilean musician, singer, songwriter and teacher, originary from Santa Cruz.

Life
Iriarte completed his Musical Arts studies in the University of Chile in 1986. He has since worked since as a teacher in Liceo Santa Cruz.

In 2004 and 2008, he was part of the jury of the National Competition of Unpublished Cueca Compositions in Santa Cruz.

Iriarte is also a member of the Sociedad Chilena del Derecho de Autor (Chilean Copyright Society, SCD).

Reír o Llorar

In 2008, Iriarte released a self-composed album called Reír o Llorar (To Laugh or To Cry) under the label Palma Records. Iriarte reportedly collaborated with Chilean New Wave artist Luis Dimas during the album production.

Track listing
 "Egoístamente Mía"
 "Llora Corazón"
 "De Tanto Amarte"
 "No Quiero Volver"
 "Amiga es Mi Dolor"
 "Volveré a Encontrar"
 "Mi Enemiga"
 "Si te Vas de Mí"
 "Me Duele el Corazón"
 "Amor No Soy Feliz"
 "Mi Estupidez"
 "Reír o Llorar"

All tracks written and composed by Mario Iriarte.

Personnel
 Mario Iriarte – lead vocals
 Cristián Palma V. – drums, bass guitar, conga, minor percussion; record producer, arrangements (all tracks but 1–2, and 5), sequential production, and planning
 Manolo Palma – organ; executive producer, arrangements (track 1–2)
 Jorge Seguel – acoustic guitar; arrangements (track 5)
 Leslie Moraga – electric guitar
 Álvaro Rivera G. – graphic artist.
 Andrés Rebolledo – bongo drums; recording and mixing engineer

References

People from Santa Cruz, Chile
Chilean musicians
1955 births
Living people
University of Chile alumni
Chilean educators